The Saqqara Tablet, now in the Egyptian Museum, is an ancient stone engraving surviving from the Ramesside Period of Egypt which features a list of pharaohs. It was found in 1861 in Saqqara, in the tomb of Tjuneroy (or Tjenry), an official ("chief lector priest" and "Overseer of Works on All Royal Monuments") of the pharaoh Ramesses II.

The inscription lists fifty-eight kings, from Anedjib and Qa'a (First Dynasty) to Ramesses II (Nineteenth Dynasty), in reverse chronological order, omitting "rulers from the Second Intermediate Period, the Hyksos, and those rulers... who had been close to the heretic Akhenaten".

The names (each surrounded by a border known as a cartouche), of which only forty-seven survive, are badly damaged. As with other Egyptian king lists, the Saqqara Tablet omits certain kings and entire dynasties.  The list counts backward from Ramesses II to the mid-point of the First Dynasty, except for the Eleventh and Twelfth Dynasties, which are reversed. A well known photograph of the king list was published in 1865. Detailed and high resolution images are able to be viewed online and inside the book Inside the Egyptian Museum with Zahi Hawass

Kings in the list 
The names are listed in reverse chronological order from the upper right to the bottom left, as they were meant to be read.

Other New Kingdom royal lists 
 Abydos king list
 Karnak king list
 Turin King List
 Medinet Habu king list

References

Bibliography
 Auguste Mariette: La table de Saqqarah in Revue Archeologique Vol 10, Paris 1864, p. 168-186, Pl. 17
 Emmanuel de Rougé: Album photographique de la mission remplie en Égypte, Paris 1865, Photographs, No. 143-145
 Auguste Mariette: Monuments divers recueillis en Égypte et en Nubie (Tables), Paris 1872, Vol. II, Pl. 58
 Eduard Meyer: Ägyptische Chronologie, Pl. 1, (Berlin 1904)

13th-century BC works
1861 archaeological discoveries
Ancient Egyptian King lists
Egyptian Museum